Loch Moidart is a sea loch (sea inlet) in the district of Moidart in Highland, Scotland. It is on the west coast of Scotland, and runs about 8 km (5 miles) eastward from the sea. It is connected to the sea by two narrow channels which are separated by the island of Eilean Shona, which in turn is nearly split in two by a narrow isthmus. The River Moidart enters the loch at its head, near the hamlet of Ardmolich (Àird Molach). Various views of the Loch have featured as an Apple TV screensaver since 2021.

The A861 runs along the loch's northern shore; it is a remote circuitous route which connects to the A830 at both ends, without passing through any significant settlements.

References

Moidart